Ali Asad may refer to:

 Ali Asad (cricketer, born 1976), United Arab Emirates cricketer of Pakistani descent 
 Ali Asad (cricketer, born 1988), Pakistani cricketer
 Ali Asad (wrestler) (born 2000), Pakistani wrestler

See also
 Asad Ali (disambiguation)